Draga is a surname.

Those bearing it include:

 Hajdin bej Draga (fl. 1910s), Albanian activist
 Nexhip Draga (1867–1920), Albanian politician

See also 
Draga (given name)